Canoeing is an activity which involves paddling a canoe with a single-bladed paddle. Common meanings of the term are limited to when the canoeing is the central purpose of the activity. Broader meanings include when it is combined with other activities such as canoe camping, or where canoeing is merely a transportation method used to accomplish other activities. Most present-day canoeing is done as or as a part of a sport or recreational activity. In some parts of Europe canoeing refers to both canoeing and kayaking, with a canoe being called an open canoe.

A few of the recreational forms of canoeing are canoe camping and canoe racing.  Other forms include a wide range of canoeing on lakes, rivers, oceans, ponds and streams.

History of organized recreational canoeing 

Canoeing is an ancient mode of transportation.  Modern recreational canoeing was established in the late 19th century. In 1924, canoeing associations from Austria, Germany, Denmark and Sweden founded the Internationalen Representation for Kanusport, forerunner of the International Canoe Federation. Canoeing became part of the Olympic Games in the summer of 1936. The main form of competitive sport was canoe sprint using a sprint canoe. Others include canoe polo, whitewater canoeing, canoe marathon, ICF canoe marathon, and playboating.

National canoe associations include the American, Canadian, British, Scottish, and Welsh.

Recreational canoeing

Most present-day canoeing is done as or as a part of a sport or recreational activity. In some parts of Europe, canoeing refers to both canoeing and kayaking, with a canoe being called an Open canoe.  A few of the recreational forms of canoeing are canoe camping and canoe racing such as canoe sprint and canoe marathons.  Other forms include a wide range of canoeing on lakes, rivers, oceans, ponds and streams.

The summer Olympics include canoeing competitions. Canoe slalom (previously known as whitewater slalom) is a competitive sport with the aim to navigate a decked canoe or kayak through a course of hanging downstream or upstream gates on river rapids in the fastest time possible. It is one of the two kayak and canoeing disciplines at the Summer Olympics, and is referred to by the International Olympic Committee (IOC) as Canoe/Kayak Slalom. The other Olympic canoeing discipline is canoe sprint.

In his lifetime, according to the Guinness Book of World Records, Verlen Kruger paddled the most miles (over 100,000 miles) of anyone in the sport.

See also 
List of sprint canoeists by country
Outline of canoeing and kayaking
Canoe paddle strokes
Kayak
Canadian (canoe)

References

External links

International Canoe Federation (ICF)
CanoeResults.eu (results of mayor canoe competitions)

 

Summer Olympic sports